Audio Partnership Plc is a British manufacturer of hi-fi, home cinema and home automation products, which was founded in 1994.

Brands
 Cambridge Audio, which produces amplifiers, AV receivers and DVD players and recorders
 Mordaunt Short, a manufacturer of loudspeakers and subwoofers. 
 Opus technologies
 Gale Loudspeakers

Products since 1994
Audio Partnership's products since 1994 include stereo amplifiers, CD players, digital-to-analogue (DAC) converters (namely the DACMagic and ISOMagic series), tuners (both analogue and digital), loudspeakers, subwoofers and cables.  In most recent years, the company branched out into home cinema, with an external 5.1 processor for older Dolby Pro-Logic amplifiers that have six-channel inputs, AV receivers as well as an extensive range of DVD players and recorders.

Manufacturer
Although the company is based in the UK, its products are manufactured in China to take advantage of lower labour costs.

References

Audio equipment manufacturers of the United Kingdom